Tarasovka is a rural locality (a village) in Angasyakovsky Selsoviet, Dyurtyulinsky District, Bashkortostan, Russia. The population was 55 as of 2010. There are 4 streets.

Geography 
Tarasovka is located 29 km north of Dyurtyuli (the district's administrative centre) by road. Mayadyk is the nearest rural locality.

References 

Rural localities in Dyurtyulinsky District